Mount Gibralfaro is a hill located in Málaga in southeast Spain. It is a 130 m high foothill of the Montes de Málaga, part of the Cordillera Penibética.

At the top of the hill stands the Castle of Gibralfaro overlooking Málaga city and the Mediterranean Sea, and connected by a walled corridor to the Alcazaba of Málaga.

History
Gibralfaro has been the site of fortifications since the Phoenician foundation of Málaga city, circa 770 BC. The location was fortified by Caliph Abd-al-Rahman III in 929 CE. At the beginning of the 14th century, Yusuf I of the Kingdom of Granada expanded the fortifications within the Phoenician lighthouse enclosure and erected a double wall to the Alcazaba. The name is said to be derived from Arabic, Jbel, rock or mount, and Greek the word for light, Jbel-Faro, meaning "Rock of Light". The castle is famous for its three-month siege in 1487 by the Catholic monarchs, King Ferdinand and Queen Isabella, which ended when hunger forced the Arabs to surrender.

The most visible remains of the Castle today are the solid ramparts rising above the pines  In the Centro de Interpretación de Gibralfaro (Gibralfaro Interpretation Center) in the former gunpowder arsenal of the Castle is a little museum that shows the castle’s history over the centuries since the Reconquest. The castle was used as a military base until 1925.

At the end of 2005, a thick forest of pines and eucalyptus trees were planted on the hill. On its outskirts are the historical buildings of the seminary and the Alcazaba, the Jardines de Puerta Oscura (Dark Gate Gardens), as well as a Parador.

Currently pending approval is a project intended to safeguard the mount and its surroundings from any urban intervention and promote it as a space for public recreation. Another project is planned to build a cable car linking the city center with the Gibralfaro castle.

Geology
Gibralfaro is part of the southern foothills of the Montes de Málaga, a mountain range of the Cordillera Penibética, formed of materials from the Maláguide complex of the Baetic Cordillera.

References

This article incorporates information from the equivalent article on the Spanish Wikipedia

External links
Malaga City - Gibralfaro Castle

Penibaetic System
Landforms of Andalusia
Hills of Spain